Dual accreditation is the practice in diplomacy of a country granting two separate responsibilities to a single diplomat. One prominent form of dual accreditation is for a diplomat to serve as the ambassador to two countries concurrently. For example,  Luxembourg's ambassador to the United States is also its non-resident ambassador to Canada and to Mexico. Such an ambassador may sometimes be called Ambassador-at-Large.

The Holy See refuses to accept dual accreditation with Italy, an assertion of sovereignty dating from the prisoner-in-the-Vatican dispute.  For example, when Ireland closed its Holy See mission in Rome, accreditation as Irish ambassador to the Holy See was given to a diplomat based at the Department of Foreign Affairs in Dublin rather than to the Irish ambassador to Italy.

See also
 Protecting power, third country representing the interests of a first country in a second, where first and second lack diplomatic relations

References

Diplomacy